The Shah dynasty, also known as the Shahs of Gorkha or the Royal House of Gorkha, was the ruling Chaubise Thakuri dynasty ; and the founder of Gorkha Kingdom from 1559 to 1768 and later the unified Kingdom of Nepal from 1768 to 28 May 2008.

The Shah dynasty traces their historical ancestor to King of Kaski, Kulamandan Shah Khand, whose grandson Dravya Shah captured the throne of Ligligkot from Khasya Khadka kings with the help of accomplices from six resident clans of Majhkot and Ligligkot. Dravya Shah named his new kingdom Gorkha.

Origins
The Shah descendants claimed to be of Rajput origin. However, they are ranked as Thakuris. He argues that:  He further contended on Shah family that:

Coronation of Dravya Shah
Dravya Shah was the youngest son of Yasho Brahma Shah, Raja (King) of Lamjung and grandson of Kulamandan Shah Khad, Raja (King) of Kaski. He became the king of Gorkha with the help of accomplices namely Kaji Ganesh Pandey. He ascended the throne of Gorkha on 1559 A.D. The loose translation of the Nepali work known as the "Wright Chronicle" describes the coronation of Dravya Shah thus:

Absolute monarchy (1768–1846)

In 1743, Prithvi Narayan Shah became the ruler of Gorkha. He declared war with other principalities, defeating them one by one. In September 1768, he established the unified kingdom of Gorkha. He became the first king of large Gorkha Kingdom. He, his sons and their successors continued fighting and defeating other kingdoms and enlarging the kingdom of Gorkha. In 1814, the Anglo–Nepalese War between Gorkha and the East India Company began. By 1815, the Shah king had been thoroughly defeated. By 1816, Gorkha had lost one-third of its territory. The Shah kings continued to rule as an absolute monarch until 1846 when the political order changed from absolute monarchy to a constitutional monarchy.

Hereditary prime ministers (1846–1951)
In 1846, the Rana dynasty gained power in Nepal. The Ranas became prime ministers and reduced the King's status to a figurehead position. The Ranas ruled Nepal as hereditary prime ministers though in the name of the figurehead king. In 1950, the Shah king King Tribhuvan went into exile in India. He and his family, including the crown prince Mahendra, later returned. After India became a secular state in 1950, and the remaining rajas retired, Nepal was the only remaining Hindu kingdom. In 1951, with the help of India, a popular politician common man Matrika Prasad Koirala became the prime minister of Nepal. Tribhuvan returned to Kathmandu. The Shah dynasty regained control and the prime minister, Mohan Shamsher Jang Bahadur Rana, resigned. King Tribhuvan ruled until 1955 and King Mahendra ruled until 1972. Mahendra's son, Birendra, became king.

Constitutional monarchy (1990–2008)

In 1990, under King Birendra, Nepal became a constitutional monarchy after a mass movement from people forced Birendra Shah to restore democracy.

Massacre of the royal family
On 1 June 2001, some members of the Shah dynasty were murdered in the royal palace. A High Commission report concluded that the royal family was slaughtered by Crown Prince Dipendra. This remains controversial. Among the dead were the Crown Prince's father, King Birendra and his brother, Prince Nirajan. After the attack, Dipendra was in a coma and was declared king for a short time. He died a few days later. Gyanendra Bir Bikram Shah Dev, Dipendra's uncle, took the throne. In February 2005, he dismissed the parliament in order to govern in his own right.

Abolition of the Shah monarchy 
On 24 December 2007, Nepal's Provisional Parliament met. It was decided that the monarchy would be abolished in 2008 after the Constituent Assembly elections. The motion enjoyed overwhelming support in the chamber, passing by a 270-vote majority. Of the 329 sitting members of parliament, only three voted against abolishing the monarchy. It was decided that for the time being, Gyanendra would retain his title and continue residing in the Royal Palace, albeit stripped of all political power and authority.

On 28 May 2008, following scheduled elections, the 1st Nepalese Constituent Assembly declared Nepal a Federal Democratic Republic and the monarchy was abolished, removing the Shah dynasty from power. Kul Bahadur Gurung said of the 601 member assembly, 560 voted in favour, 4 were against and 37 were absent or abstained. Following an Assemby agreement involving the Nepali Congress and both Nepalese Communist parties, (the Leninists and the much larger Maoist faction), Gyanendra stepped down.

Gyanendra vacated the palace in Kathmandu which later became a museum. Until they could find permanent accommodation, the royal couple were offered residence as commoners at the Nagarjuna Palace, a former royal summer residence. The Nagarjuna palace lies in forested hills about eight kilometres (five miles) northwest of Kathmandu.

Monarchs of Shah dynasty (1559–2008)

Monarchs of Shah dynasty of Gorkha (1559–1768)
The following is list of all ten kings of Gorkha hill principality.

Monarchs of Shah dynasty of Patan (1761–1765)

Monarchs of Shah dynasty of Nepal (1768–2008)

Paternal roots of Shah dynasty
Family tree of the all Shah kings of Nepal (not of previous Gorkha Kingdom) except Gyanendra Bir Bikram Shah, brother of King Birendra Bir Bikram Shah:

See also 
 Nepalese royal massacre

References

Footnotes

Notes

Books

External links 
 Royal Court of Nepal Nepalese government website.
 Gregson J. "Massacre at the palace; the doomed royal dynasty of Nepal." 2002.

 
Nepalese monarchy
Hindu monarchs
Kingdom of Nepal
Rajput rulers
Gurkhas
History of Nepal
16th-century establishments in Asia
2008 disestablishments in Nepal
Old Royal Families of Nepal
Dynasties of Nepal
16th-century establishments in Nepal